Unionville is an unincorporated community in Orange County, Virginia, United States. Unionville has a post office with ZIP code 22567.

Orange Springs was listed on the National Register of Historic Places in 1992.

References

Unincorporated communities in Orange County, Virginia
Unincorporated communities in Virginia